2-Quinolone is an organic compound related structurally to quinoline.  It is the majority tautomer in equilibrium with 2-quinolinol.  The compound can be classified as a cyclic amide, and as such is used as an isostere for peptides and other pharmaceutically inspired targets. The isomer 4-quinolone is the parent of a large class of quinolone antibiotics.

One example is Ravesilone.

References

External links